Xiaozong can be the name of the following Chinese emperors:

Emperor Xiaozong of Song China (reign: 1162–1189)
Hongzhi Emperor of the Ming Dynasty (reign: 1487–1505)

Temple name disambiguation pages